M. S. Sriram (born 30 September 1934) is an Indian former cricketer. He played 24 first-class matches for Hyderabad between 1954 and 1962.

See also
 List of Hyderabad cricketers

References

External links
 

1934 births
Living people
Indian cricketers
Hyderabad cricketers
People from Secunderabad
Cricketers from Hyderabad, India